The Largo (definite form Ларгото, Largoto) is an architectural ensemble of three Socialist Classicism edifices in central Sofia, the capital of Bulgaria, designed and built in the 1950s with the intention of becoming the city's new representative centre. Today it is regarded as one of the prime examples of Socialist Classicism architecture in Southeastern Europe, as well as one of the main landmarks of Sofia. 

The yellow-cobblestoned square around which the ensemble is centred is called Nezavisimost (Independence) Square. Independence Square is formed by the Knyaz Aleksandar Dondukov Boulevard and Tsar Osvoboditel Boulevard merging from the east to continue as Todor Aleksandrov Boulevard west of the Largo. 

The ensemble consists of the former Party House (Bulgarian Communist Party headquarters building), briefly used in 2020-2021 as the seat of the National Assembly of Bulgaria, and two side edifices: one today accommodating the TSUM department store and the Council of Ministers of Bulgaria and another that is today occupied by the President's Office, the Sofia Hotel Balkan and the Ministry of Education.

History
A Council of Ministers of Bulgaria decree was published in 1951 regarding the construction of the Largo. The lot in the centre of the city, damaged by the bombing of Sofia in World War II, was cleared in the autumn of 1952, so that the construction of the new buildings could begin in the following years. The Party House building, once crowned by a red star on a pole, was designed by a team under architect Petso Zlatev and completed in 1955. The Ministry of Electrification office, later occupied by the State Council and today by the President's Office, the work of Petso Zlatev, Petar Zagorski and other architects, was finished the following year, while the TZUM part of the edifice, designed by a team under Kosta Nikolov, followed in 1957. The fountain between the President's Office and the older National Archaeological Museum, was shaped in 1958. The Largo also once featured a statue of Vladimir Lenin, which was later removed and replaced by the one of St. Sophia in 2000.

Refurbishment

Following the democratic changes after 1989, the symbols of communism in the decoration of the Largo were removed, with the most symbolic act being the removing of the red star on a pole atop the former Party House using a helicopter and its substitution by the flag of Bulgaria. In the 1990s there have been suggestions to reshape the former Party House, sometimes regarded as an imposing remnant of a past ideology, by introducing more modern architectural elements.

According to the new architectural plan of Sofia, Independence Square is  being reorganized. The lawn and the flags in the centre are replaced by glass domes, so that the ruins of the ancient Thracian and Roman city of Serdica can be exposed in an impressive way, thus becoming a tourist attraction. The two underpasses, the one in front of the former Party House and the one with the medieval Church of St Petka, are also connected to ease the access to the nearby Serdika and Serdika II metro stations.

Gallery

References

Buildings and structures in Sofia
Stalinist architecture
Squares in Sofia
Tourist attractions in Sofia
Headquarters of political parties
Seats of national legislatures
Presidential residences
1955 establishments in Bulgaria